Żelazno is a historical village in the administrative district of Gmina Kłodzko, within Kłodzko County, Lower Silesian Voivodeship, in south-western Poland. The population as of 2017 is 973.

The history of Żelazno/Eisersdorf goes back to the 13th century when it was part of an ancient trade route called the Amber Road. The settlement was first mentioned as Eyserzdorf in 1326. The settlement's prosperous medieval history left its legacy, which can be seen to this day. The village also features a 15th-century Gothic tower, an 18th-century palace and a manor house that once belonged to the famous Münchhausen aristocratic family. Prior to 1945 Eisersdorf was part of Germany and after World War II it was renamed Żelazno upon being transferred to Poland.

Gallery

References

Villages in Kłodzko County